Pelin Batu (born 27 December 1978) is a Turkish author, actress, historian, and television personality.

Biography
Due to her father İnal Batu's career as a diplomat, she spent her childhood in many foreign countries including Pakistan, Cyprus, Czech Republic, France and the USA. She completed high school at Marymount School in New York City and pursued musical and theatre training at Mannes College of Music. After starting literature and philosophy at New York University, she switched her subject to history and completed it at Boğaziçi University in Istanbul. She made her film debut in 1999, portraying the role of Circassian Nevres in Harem Suare and has gone on to act with several more films and TV series.

Batu also co-hosted a show titled Tarihin Arka Odası (The Back Room of History) which aired on HaberTürk with Murat Bardakçı and Erhan Afyoncu. Interested in poetry from a young age, she has written, translated, and published many poems. Her first book of poetry "Glass" was published in 2003, followed by "The Book of Winds" in 2009. She left the program in 2011.

She has also appeared on the Turkish TV program Yeni Şeyler Söylemek Lazım, a part of the TRT Haber news channel on 25 December 2010, in which she read her poem of "Wind of Black Stones" herself from her book. Having written poems from the age of eight, on this program she said that even though she is an atheist, if reincarnation existed she would be the reincarnation of the grandfather, Selahattin Batu, as he was also known for his interest in poetry and whom she is commonly compared to.

Batu was also a columnist for the daily Milliyet newspaper (2012–2014).

Filmography

Bibliography
 Glass / Cam, 113pp, 2003, Yapı Kredi, 
 Yahudilik Tarihi, 304pp, 2007, Yapı Kredi, 
 The Book Of Winds Rüzgarlar Kitabı, 224pp, 2009, Artshop, 
 Resim Defteri, 48pp, 2013, Artshop, 
 Her Şey Bir Hikaye İle Başladı, 2018, İnkılâp Kitabevi, 
 Labirentin, 2018, İnkılâp Kitabevi,

References

External links
 

1978 births
20th-century Turkish actresses
21st-century Turkish actresses
Former Muslims turned agnostics or atheists
Living people
Turkish film actresses
Turkish writers
Turkish television actresses
Turkish television personalities
People from Ankara
Boğaziçi University alumni
Turkish people of Circassian descent
Turkish people of Albanian descent
Turkish former Muslims
Turkish atheism activists
Actresses from Ankara